L'Aiglon is an opera (drame musical) in five acts composed by Arthur Honegger and Jacques Ibert. Honegger composed acts 2, 3, and 4, with Ibert composing acts 1 and 5. A 2016 reviewer described it as "a singular piece of work" with its "blend of operetta, divertissement, conversation piece, historical pageant and, in the disturbingly powerful fourth act set on the Napoleonic battlefield at Wagram, phantasmagoria peopled with living figures onstage and dead voices off".

Background
The libretto by Henri Cain was based on Edmond Rostand's 1900 play, L'Aiglon ("The Eaglet"), about the life of Napoleon II, who was the son of Emperor Napoleon I and his second wife, Empress Marie Louise.

It premiered at the Opéra de Monte-Carlo on 11 March 1937 in a production by Pierre Chéreau. The principal roles were sung by Fanny Heldy and Vanni Marcoux.

At the Paris Opera that August, Heldy repeated her performance alongside Vanni-Marcoux under François Ruhlmann. The work was revived there in 1952 with Géori Boué in the title role under André Cluytens.

The work was revived in February 2016 at the Opéra de Marseille with Stéphanie d'Oustrac in the title role and conducted by Jean-Yves Ossonce.

A 1956 French radio recording with Boué conducted by Pierre Dervaux was later issued on CD, and a full studio Decca recording under Kent Nagano, following concert performances in Montreal, was released in 2016.

Roles

Synopsis
The Duke of Reichstadt (Napoleon II), with his faithful footman Séraphin Flambeau, escapes from Austrian imprisonment and visits the old site of the Battle of Wagram, before eventually dying of tuberculosis.

References

Further reading
 
 Kennedy, Michael (2006), The Oxford Dictionary of Music, 985 pages, 
 Spratt, Geoffrey K., The Music of Arthur Honegger, Cork University Press, 1987, p. 544. 
 Warrack, John and West, Ewan (1992), The Oxford Dictionary of Opera, 782 pages, 

Operas
French-language operas
1937 operas
Operas set in the 19th century
Operas set in Austria
Operas by multiple composers
Operas by Arthur Honegger
Operas by Jacques Ibert
Opera world premieres at the Opéra de Monte-Carlo
Adaptations of works by Edmond Rostand
Operas based on real people
Operas based on plays
Cultural depictions of Klemens von Metternich
Cultural depictions of Napoleon II